Antoine Louis Albitte (30 December 1761, Dieppe, Seine-Maritime – 23 December 1812, Rossienie) was a French Revolutionary politician. He was deputy for Seine-Inférieure in the Legislative Assembly and the National Convention, where he was known as "Albitte the elder" to distinguish him from his brother Jean-Louis Albitte - he sat there from pluviôse, Year II. He also fought as an officer in the French Revolutionary Wars and Napoleonic Wars - he died of cold, fatigue and hunger on the retreat from Russia after three days of suffering.

Life
Born into a merchant family in Dieppe, he studied at the town's Oratorian college before studying law in Rouen, where he became a lawyer. He set up home in Dieppe and became a freemason

References

Sources
 
 
 
 Françoise Brunel, « Albitte Antoine-Louis », dans 
 

 
 
 
 .

People from Dieppe, Seine-Maritime
1761 births
1812 deaths
Members of the Legislative Assembly (France)
Deputies to the French National Convention
Jacobins
Représentants en mission
French Republican military leaders of the French Revolutionary Wars
Chevaliers of the Légion d'honneur
18th-century French lawyers
Politicians from Normandy
French military personnel killed in the Napoleonic Wars
French invasion of Russia